A number of steamships have been named Leonardo da Vinci, including:

 
 

Ship names
pl:SS Leonardo da Vinci